Turkish Airlines Flight 1878 was an international passenger flight from Milan–Malpensa Airport, Italy to Atatürk Airport, Istanbul, Turkey. On 25 April 2015, the aircraft rolled sharply just before landing causing a very hard touchdown resulting in substantial damage to the starboard wing and a fire. A go-around was initiated and the aircraft positioned for a second approach attempt but veered off the runway on the second landing. All 102 passengers and crew survived unharmed.

Accident
A tail strike was followed by a hard landing on the starboard main gear. This caused substantial damage to the starboard wing, including the rupturing of fuel lines.

During the approach to land on runway 35L, a passenger noticed the damaged wing was on fire. During the second landing, at 10:41 local time (07:41 UTC), the aircraft's right landing gear collapsed and the aircraft spun almost 180° off the runway. The airport's fire and rescue service attended the aircraft and the fire was extinguished. All on board evacuated the aircraft via the emergency slides. There were no injuries reported. The flight crew claimed that wake turbulence from a Boeing 787 Dreamliner which landed ahead of them may have been the reason for the initial roll and contact with the runway.

Following the accident, the airport was temporarily closed, with flights being diverted to Sabiha Gökçen International Airport or other airports near IST. Turkish Airlines cancelled 95 flights from Istanbul.

Aircraft
The accident aircraft was an Airbus A320-200, registration TC-JPE, named Gümüşhane. The aircraft's manufacturer's serial number was 2941. It had first flown on 18 October 2006 and was repainted into the Star Alliance livery in 2014. The aircraft was subsequently written off.

Investigation
The Directorate General of Civil Aviation is responsible for investigating aviation accidents in Turkey and has commenced an investigation.

See also
 Accidents and incidents involving the Airbus A320 family
 Asiana Airlines Flight 162

References

External links
Photograph of the damaged aircraft in flight

Accidents and incidents involving the Airbus A320
1878
2015 in Turkey
Aviation accidents and incidents in 2015
Aviation accidents and incidents in Turkey
Istanbul Atatürk Airport
2015 in Istanbul
April 2015 events in Turkey